The Hathaway Bridge along U.S. Route 98 connects Panama City with Panama City Beach, Florida.

History
Constructed in 2003, it replaced two previous bridges that were unable to carry the increasingly high number of users. The original St. Andrews Bay Bridge was built in 1929 and renamed for Franz Hathaway, chairman of Florida's State Road Department.  The second Hathaway bridge replaced Hathaway I was completed in 1959. In 1997, the state of Florida issued more than $80 million for construction of the new Hathaway Bridge.  Portions of both Hathaway I and II are still submerged to the south of the present day Hathaway bridge.

See also

References

Road bridges in Florida
Transportation buildings and structures in Bay County, Florida
Buildings and structures in Panama City, Florida
U.S. Route 98
Panama City Beach, Florida
Bridges of the United States Numbered Highway System
2003 establishments in Florida

Bridges completed in 2003
Bridges completed in 1959